Persoonia hindii is a plant in the family Proteaceae and is endemic to a small area of New South Wales near Lithgow. It is a shrub with an underground stolon from which new stems arise and has succulent, linear to oblong leaves and deep yellow flowers.

Description
Persoonia hindii is an erect or spreading shrub with many stems that grow from an underground stolon about  underground. Younger stem are mostly dull red and are covered with greyish hairs. Young leaves are slightly hairy but become glabrous as they age. The flowers are arranged singly or in small groups of up to thirteen in leaf axils or on the ends of branches, with a scale leaf at the base of each flower. The central style is surrounded by four yellow anthers which are also joined at the base with the tips rolled back, so that it resembles a cross when viewed end-on. The ovary is glabrous.

Taxonomy and naming
Persoonia hindii was first formally described in 1997 by Peter Weston and Lawrie Johnson from a specimen collected in the Newnes State Forest. The description was published in  Telopea. The specific epithet (hindii) honours Peter Hind, who first collected this species in 1989.

Distribution and habitat
This persoonia is only known from nine populations in the Newnes State Forest, each population consisting of only one to a small number of individual plants. It grows in forest and woodland dominated by species of Eucalyptus.

Conservation
Persoonia hindii is threatened by forestry activities, sand mining and frequent fires and is classified as "Endangered" under the New South Wales Government Biodiversity Conservation Act 2016.

References

hindii
Flora of New South Wales
Proteales of Australia
Plants described in 1997